Rahul Sankrityayan Inter College Rajesultanpur (Rahul Sankrityayan Inter College Rajesultanpur, Hindi: राहुल सास्कृतायन इण्टर कालेज,राजेसुल्तानपुर) is an intermediate college located in Rajesultanpur, Uttar Pradesh. It was established in 1990 by the Government of India.

References

External links
 Education Boards in India
 Board of High School and Intermediate Education Uttar Pradesh

Intermediate colleges in Uttar Pradesh
Education in Ambedkar Nagar district
Rajesultanpur
Educational institutions established in 1990
1990 establishments in Uttar Pradesh